The Killing Secret (also known as The Secret) is a 1997 made-for-television drama that originally aired on January 6 on NBC. The film, directed by Noel Nosseck and produced by Philip K. Kleinbart, starred Ari Meyers, Soleil Moon Frye, Tess Harper and Mark Kassen.

Plot 
The Killing Secret was thought to be based on the true story of Emily Garcia, however, her murder was later solved and does not match the storyline of the film. It may also have been based in part on the murder of Becky Stowe, by her boyfriend Robert Leamon.

In the film, Greg (Kassen) is dating Nicole (Meyers) but sleeps with Emily (Frye) who becomes pregnant. Faced with the loss of his college athletic scholarship, Greg kills Emily. The film revolves around the investigation and eventual arrest and conviction of Greg for the murder.

Home Video 
The Killing Secret was released on DVD in the United States in 2006.

References

External links

American drama television films
1997 television films
Films directed by Noel Nosseck